Are You Going to Eat That is an album by the American alternative rock band Hazel, released in 1995.

Production
The album was produced by Donna Dresch and Hazel.

Critical reception
Trouser Press thought that "Hazel’s pop penchant has been de-emphasized in favor of the miasma of indie rock." CMJ New Music Monthly praised the band's ability to "write mid-tempo songs that aren't dirgey or mopey or whiny." The Record wrote that "Hazel is blessed by the outstanding vocal harmonies of guitarist Peter Krebs and drummer Jody Bleyle, which invite comparisons to John Doe and Exene Cervenka of the pioneering punk band X."

The Stranger called the songs "impeccable pop, girded spiritually and sonically by punk and what used to be called college rock, and set alight by the vocal interplay of guitarist Pete Krebs and drummer Jody Bleyle." The Tampa Tribune deemed the album "pleasant but inconsequential alterna-pop."

AllMusic wrote that "with nothing but the boy-girl vocals to carry the record, it becomes a long haul, despite only being 35 minutes."

Track listing

References

1995 albums
Sub Pop albums